The 2008 World Short Track Speed Skating Championships took place between 7 and 9 March 2008 in Gangneung, South Korea. The World Championships are organised by the ISU which also run world cups and championships in speed skating and figure skating.

Results

Men

* First place is awarded 34 points, second is awarded 21 points, third is awarded 13 points, fourth is awarded 8 points, fifth is awarded 5 points, sixth is awarded 3 points, seventh is awarded 2 points and eighth is awarded 1 point in the finals of each individual race to determine the overall world champion. The relays do not count for the overall classification.

Women

* First place is awarded 34 points, second is awarded 21 points, third is awarded 13 points, fourth is awarded 8 points, fifth is awarded 5 points, sixth is awarded 3 points, seventh is awarded 2 points, and eighth is awarded 1 point in the finals of each individual race to determine the overall world champion. The relays do not count for the overall classification.

Medal table

External links
 ISU Results
 Results book

World Short Track Speed Skating Championships
World Championships
World Short Track
International speed skating competitions hosted by South Korea
Sports competitions in Gangneung
World Short Track